Frederick Bancroft may refer to:
 Frederick Bancroft (educator) (1855–1929), Canadian educator
 Frederick J. Bancroft (1834–1903), American physician

See also
 Frederic Bancroft (1860–1945), American historian, author, and librarian